1832 in sports describes the year's events in world sport.

Boxing
Events
 25 June — Jem Ward announces his retirement when challenged by James Burke for his English title.  Ward nevertheless refuses to concede the title.

Cricket
Events
 27 March — death of James Saunders (29) who had been ill with consumption for the last two years.  Scores and Biographies states that he was a "great batsman" who "had scarcely reached his prime".
England
 Most runs – Fuller Pilch 287 @ 31.88 (HS 50)
 Most wickets – William Lillywhite 71 (BB 6–?)

Horse racing
England
 1,000 Guineas Stakes – Galata
 2,000 Guineas Stakes – Archibald
 The Derby – St. Giles
 The Oaks – Galata 
 St. Leger Stakes – Margrave

Rowing
The Boat Race
 The Oxford and Cambridge Boat Race is not held this year

References

Bibliography
 Arthur Haygarth, Scores & Biographies, Volume 1 (1744–1826), Lillywhite, 1862

 
Sports by year